Henry Edward Sweetser (Feb. 19, 1837-Feb. 17, 1870) was an American newspaper and magazine editor.

Sweetser was the son of Joseph A., and Catherine (Dickinson) Sweetser, aunt of poet Emily Dickinson.  He was born in New York City, Feb. 19, 1837.  He graduated from Yale College in 1858.  The first year after his graduation was spent in the store of his father (firm of J. A Sweetser & Co.) in New York City, after which he was for a few months a reporter for the New York Times. In June, 1860, he entered the office of the World, of which he soon became night-editor. In November, 1863, with Charles Humphreys Sweetser, his cousin, he started the Round Table, the publication of which, suspended August, 1864, was resumed June, 1865; during this interval he returned to the office of the World.  (In March 1864, the Round Table published Dickinson's "Some keep the Sabbath going to Church", one of only ten poems to appear in print in her lifetime, and the only one published in a magazine.)  He withdrew from the Round Table in May, 1866, and, after a short visit to Europe, in September of the same year again joined the World and was connected with it chiefly as city editor and editor of the weekly and semi-weekly editions, until his death.  He died suddenly in New York City, Feb. 17, 1870, aged 38 years.

References

External links

1837 births
1870 deaths
Yale College alumni
American newspaper editors
American magazine editors
Journalists from New York City